Aquila Nebeker (June 17, 1859 – February 21, 1933) was an American politician, attorney, lawman, and rancher.  A Democrat, he was the president of the Utah State Senate during its second term. It was under his direction that the state legislature failed to elect a representative of Utah to the United States Senate.Nebeker served as acting governor of Utah for a short time. Nebeker later served as U.S. Marshal over southeastern Utah and was involved in the a standoff between the U.S. government and Ute Indians.

Nebeker was on June 17, 1859, in Salt Lake City, to John and Lurena Fitzgerlad Nebeker. He attended schools in Salt Lake City and the University of Deseret—now known as the University of Utah. He died on February 21, 1933, at his ranch in Laketown, Utah, of complications from pneumonia.

References

References
 

1859 births
1933 deaths
Democratic Party Utah state senators
United States Marshals
Politicians from Salt Lake City
University of Utah alumni
Deaths from pneumonia in Utah